Droog may refer to:
 Droog, a Nadsat slang term for "friend" in Anthony Burgess's novel A Clockwork Orange and the Stanley Kubrick film adaptation
 The Droogs, a United States rock group named after the Nadsat term
 The Droogs (renamed to The Gandharvas), a Canadian rock group
 Droogs (rocks), steep rocks in India
 Droog (company), a Netherlands-based design company
 Your Old Droog, aka Dmitry Kutsenko, a Ukrainian-born American rapper and producer from Brooklyn, New York.